Kylie Ledbrook (born 20 March 1986) is an Australian soccer player, who plays for Western Sydney Wanderers in the Australian W-League.

Club career

In 2013 Ledbrook retired from professional football to start a family and set up her career off the field. After playing with the Macarthur Rams in the NSW NPLW she decided to return to the W-League.

Sydney FC, 2017-2018
On 15 October 2017, Ledbrook returned to Sydney FC after being absent from the W-League since 2013. She appeared in 13 matches for Sydney and scored 6 goals. Sydney made it all the way to the 2018 W-League Grand Final where they lost 2–0 to Melbourne City.

Western Sydney Wanderers, 2018-present
On August 23, 2018, Ledbrook signed with the Western Sydney Wanderers for the 2018-19 W-League Season. She was one of several players who made the move from Sydney FC to the rival club Western Sydney Wanderers.

International career
She has represented Australia at the 2004 FIFA World Under 19 Women's Championship, 2004 Olympics, 2006 AFC Women's Asian Cup and the 2006 FIFA World Under 20 Women's Championship.

Career statistics

International goals

Honours

Club
Sydney FC:
 W-League Premiership: 2009, 2011–12
 W-League Championship: 2009

Country
Australia
 AFC Women's Asian Cup: 2010
 OFC U-20 Women's Championship: 2004

References

External links
 
 

1986 births
Living people
Australian women's soccer players
Sydney FC (A-League Women) players
A-League Women players
Olympic soccer players of Australia
Footballers at the 2004 Summer Olympics
Australia women's international soccer players
Women's association football midfielders